Toisa Pisces is a Liberia-flagged well test and servicing vessel owned and operated by Sealion Shipping Ltd. She is classified by Det Norske Veritas as an oil production and storage unit.

Toisa Pisces was built in 1997 by Ulstein Verft in Norway as a drilling platform supplier and cable ship. In 1997–2000 she was owned and operated by France Câbles et Radio under the name of Fresnel and under the flag of France. In 2000–2003 she was owned by FT Marine SAS. In 2003, the ship was purchased by Sealion Shipping and it was converted at the Gdańsk Shipyard as oil processing unit. She was renamed Toisa Pisces and registered in Monrovia, Liberia.

References

1997 ships
Merchant ships of Liberia
Ships built in Ulstein
Floating production storage and offloading vessels